Irciniidae is a family of sea sponges in the order Dictyoceratida.

Genera
Bergquistia Sim & Lee, 2002
Ircinia Nardo, 1833
Psammocinia von Lendenfeld, 1889
Sarcotragus Schmidt, 1862

References

Dictyoceratida
Sponge families